Thyra Talvase Bethell  (née Beetham, 5 December 1882 – 16 November 1972) was a New Zealand Red Cross organizer and women's community leader. She was born at Brancepeth Station, Wairarapa, New Zealand, on 5 December 1882.

In 1918, Bethell was appointed a Member of the Order of the British Empire, for services in connection with the New Zealand branch of the British Red Cross Society and Order of St John. In 1953, she was awarded the Queen Elizabeth II Coronation Medal.

References

1882 births
1972 deaths
New Zealand Members of the Order of the British Empire
People from the Wairarapa
New Zealand women in World War I